The Iron Spider is a fictional powered exoskeleton used by several characters in Marvel Comics.

Publication history
The Iron Spider armor first appeared in The Amazing Spider-Man #529 and was designed by Joe Quesada, based on a sketch by Chris Bachalo.

Peter Parker wore this gold and red suit as Spider-Man's official costume until writer J. Michael Straczynski chose to revert to the older costume. It was used symbolically to show the character's divided loyalties during the 2006–2007 "Civil War" storyline.

Known wearers

Peter Parker

Scarlet Spiders
The Iron Spider armor costume has been duplicated and used by MVP's three genetic clones in the Initiative who identify themselves as Red Team and also labeled the Scarlet Spiders. It is unknown as to what new powers the team possesses, but they have been shown to use some of the built-in powers such as the cloaking device, communications, and waldoes which the original costume possessed. One change is that there are now four waldoes, as opposed to three. These suits have the original's morphing ability, as well as web-shooters, and wall-crawling capability.

Mary Jane Watson

Mary Jane Watson later donned the Iron Spider armor in order to help Spider-Man and Iron Man fight Regent. She uses her experience in Iron Man's suit and her brief spider powers that she had back in the Spider-Island storyline to operate the armor.

Aaron Davis

Aaron Davis purchases a recolored and modified Iron Spider armor which he uses to form his incarnation of the Sinister Six.

Amadeus Cho

Amadeus Cho wears a version of the suit in the comic book The Totally Awesome Hulk.

Powers and abilities
Supported by a system similar to that of Tony Stark's classic Iron Man design, The Iron Spider armor features many gadgets, including three mechanical spider-arms, or "waldoes", that can be used to see around corners (via cameras in the tips) and to manipulate objects indirectly. Stark describes them as too delicate to use in combat, yet Spider-Man shortly afterward uses them to smash through the sensors in Titanium Man's helmet. Later on during the "Civil War" arc, he uses them (reluctantly) during his fight with Captain America.

Other features include short-distance gliding capability, limited bulletproofing, built-in fire/police/emergency scanner, audio/visual amplification (including infrared and ultraviolet), cloaking device, carbon filters to keep out airborne toxins, and a short-range GPS microwave communication system. It grants the ability to breathe under water, and can morph into different shapes due to its "'smart' liquid metal" form. It can also "more or less disappear" when not needed due to reactions to neurological impulses as Tony Stark revealed. The new costume is able to look like other styles of costumes Spider-Man has worn over the years or turn into his street clothes. Part of the costume can detach itself from Spider-Man to cover an object too dangerous to touch, such as a radioactive asteroid. All these features are controlled by a computer system in the chest piece. The suit responds to mental control.

The Iron Spider armor also has a secret override that can be activated by Iron Man in case of emergencies or if Spider-Man ever switches sides.  However, unknown to Stark, Peter was already aware of the safety measure and had bypassed it with his own override, Passcode Surprise. Perhaps most sinister, Stark discovered a way to give his own Iron Man armor a "spider-sense" based on Peter's, and the ability to give Spider-Man's sense red herrings.

Other versions
In the pages of Contest of Champions, a variation of Natasha Romanov donned the Iron Spider identity in an unidentified alternate reality where Iron Man used the Reality Gem to rig the Civil War in his favor where he later became President of the United States. She inherited it after Peter defected to Captain America's side and later became a member of the Civil Warriors.

In other media

Television
The Iron Spider armor appears in Ultimate Spider-Man. This version includes repulsors on the palms and feet, similar to those of Iron Man. It is initially used by Peter Parker in the episodes "Flight of the Iron Spider", "The Iron Octopus", and "Venom Bomb" before Amadeus Cho takes up the Iron Spider mantle in subsequent seasons. Additionally, the episode "Rampaging Rhino" features a "Iron Spider Hulkbuster" variant created by Dr. Curt Connors.
 Amadeus Cho / Iron Spider appears in Lego Marvel Super Heroes: Avengers Reassembled.

Film
The Iron Spider armor appears in films set in the Marvel Cinematic Universe. This version's appearance sports a more "classic" look than that of the comics, with dark red and blue tones throughout, as well as gold highlights. Additionally, the armor uses nanotechnology that allows Peter Parker / Spider-Man to survive at high altitudes and on alien worlds and features a set of four mechanical legs that sprout from the back.
 It first appears briefly in Spider-Man: Homecoming (2017), wherein Tony Stark offers Parker the suit and membership into the Avengers, though Parker declines both. 
 The armor returns in Avengers: Infinity War (2018), wherein Stark uses it to save Parker after he falls from Ebony Maw's Q-ship and into Earth's atmosphere. Parker uses the suit for the rest of the film while helping Stark, Doctor Strange, and the Guardians of the Galaxy fight Thanos until most of the heroes become victims of the Blip. 
 The armor returns in Avengers: Endgame (2019) when Parker and the Blip's other victims are resurrected and join the Avengers' battle against an alternate timeline version of Thanos.
 The armor briefly returns in the opening of Spider-Man: Far From Home (2019), though Parker leaves it at home in favor of focusing on his social life and going on a European school trip.
 The armor returns in Spider-Man: No Way Home, during which Parker uses it to fight Otto Octavius, who tears a chunk of nanotechnology off of Parker and merges it with his mechanical tentacles, though Spider-Man uses this to defeat him. After Octavius receives a new inhibitor chip, he returns the Iron Spider suit to Parker.

Video games
 The Iron Spider suit appears as an unlockable costume in the Wii version of Spider-Man: Web of Shadows.
 The Iron Spider suit appears as an alternate costume for Peter Parker / Spider-Man in Marvel Ultimate Alliance.
 The Iron Spider suit appears as an unlockable alternate costume for Peter Parker / Spider-Man in Marvel Ultimate Alliance 2.
 The Iron Spider suit appears as an alternate costume for Spider-Man 2099 in Spider-Man: Shattered Dimensions and Spider-Man: Edge of Time.
 The Iron Spider suit appears as an alternate costume for Peter Parker / Spider-Man in Marvel vs. Capcom 3: Fate of Two Worlds.
 The Iron Spider suit appears as an alternate costume for Peter Parker / Spider-Man in Marvel: Avengers Alliance.
 The Iron Spider suit appears in Spider-Man Unlimited, with the MCU version and Mary Jane Watson incarnation appearing in later updates.
 Amadeus Cho / Iron Spider appears as a DLC character in Lego Marvel's Avengers.
 Mary Jane Watson / Iron Spider appears in Marvel Avengers Academy.
 The Iron Spider suit appears as an alternate costume for Peter Parker / Spider-Man in Marvel vs. Capcom: Infinite.
 The MCU Iron Spider suit appears as an unlockable alternate costume for Peter Parker / Spider-Man in Marvel's Spider-Man, with the comics' version of the suit being released later as part of the "Turf Wars" DLC.

References

External links
 Iron Spider Armor at Marvel Wiki

Marvel Comics superheroes
Spider-Man
Fictional armour